was a Japanese football player. He played for Japan national team.

Club career
Saito was born in Osaka Prefecture on September 24, 1908. He played for Kwangaku Club was consisted of his alma mater Kwansei Gakuin University players and graduates. At the club, he won 1929 Emperor's Cup with Yukio Goto, Hideo Sakai and so on.

National team career
In May 1930, when Saito was a Kwansei Gakuin University student, he was selected Japan national team for 1930 Far Eastern Championship Games in Tokyo and Japan won the championship. At this competition, on May 25, he debuted against Philippines. On May 29, he also played against Republic of China. He played 2 games for Japan in 1930.

After retirement
After graduating from Kwansei Gakuin University, Saito retired playing career and want to England and studied football at University of Bristol. In 1933, he joined Osaka Mainichi Shimbun and he was engaged in the management and reporting of All Japan High School Soccer Tournament until 1940. After that, he worked at Hino Motors and some affiliates until 1989. He also served as the president at some Hino Motors affiliates.

Saito died in 2004.

National team statistics

References

External links
 
 Japan National Football Team Database

1908 births
2004 deaths
Kwansei Gakuin University alumni
Association football people from Osaka Prefecture
Japanese footballers
Japan international footballers
Association football goalkeepers